Teresa Rodrigo Anoro (195621 April 2020) was a Spanish scientist who worked in particle physics. Whilst at CERN, Rodrigo worked on the Compact Muon Solenoid and research for the Higgs boson.

Career
In 1994, Rodrigo became a professor of atomic physics at the University of Cantabria. She worked on the Collider Detector at Fermilab experiment that discovered the top quark in 1995.

Rodrigo worked on Higgs boson research, and collaborated with CERN. She was the first Spanish female scientist to work at CERN, and worked on the UA1 experiment, and from 1994, she worked on the Compact Muon Solenoid (CMS) at the Large Hadron Collider in CERN. She managed a team of 30 IFCA employees on the CMS project, and managed one of the teams that worked on proving the existence of the Higgs boson. In 2010, she became president of CERN's International Collaboration Council, making her the first Spanish physicist to be part of the International Collaboration Council.

From 2016 to 2019, Rodrigo was a director of IFCA. She was the sixth director of IFCA, and the first female director. Rodrigo also collaborated on the European Strategy for Particle Physics.

Awards
In 2014, Rodrigo was named one of the 100 most influential women in Spain by website Mujeresycia.com. In 2016, Rodrigo received the Julio Peláez Prize for Pioneers of Physical, Chemical and Mathematical Sciences for her work on the discovery of the Higgs boson.

Personal life
Rodrigo was born in Lleida, Spain. She studied at the University of Zaragoza, and earned a PhD from  La Junta de Energía Nuclear (now CIEMAT).

Rodrigo died on 21 April 2020 in Santander, Spain.

References

1956 births
2020 deaths
People associated with CERN
People from Lleida
Spanish women physicists
University of Zaragoza alumni
20th-century Spanish women scientists
20th-century Spanish physicists
21st-century Spanish women scientists
21st-century Spanish physicists
Academic staff of the University of Cantabria
Physicists from Catalonia